Tom French (born 1966 in Kilkenny) is an Irish poet.

Life
He was born in Kilkenny in 1966 and raised across the border in Tipperary. He graduated from National University of Ireland, Galway and the University of Limerick.

He lives with his family close to the coast of County Meath, where he earns his living in the County library service.

He received bursaries in literature from An Chomhairle Ealaíon/The Arts Council, Ireland in 1999 and 2009. His work has appeared in numerous national and international publications.

Awards
 Ted McNulty prize
 2002 Forward Poetry Prize Best First Collection
 2015 The Dermot Healy International Poetry Prize
 2016 Lawrence O’Shaughnessy Award for Poetry

Works

References

External links
 Author Page, Gallery Press
 The Night Ahead, echapbook from Smithereens Press
 Taking the Oath, echapbook from Smithereens Press
 Review of Midnightstown, Irish Times
 Lawrence O’Shaughnessy Award for Poetry
 "Raw and Rural", The Poetry Society
 "Over The Edge Celebrates Sixth Birthday with Reading by Tom French"

1966 births
Living people
Alumni of the University of Galway
Alumni of the University of Limerick
Irish poets